Prisons FC is a Tanzanian football club owned by the Tanzania Prisons Service based in Mbeya. Their home games are played at Sokoine Stadium.

Achievements
Tanzanian Premier League: 1
 1999

References

External links
Logo

 
Mbeya
Works association football clubs in Tanzania